Nate Grimes (born May 1, 1996) is an American professional basketball player for Sigal Prishtina of the Kosovo Basketball League. He played college basketball for the Fresno State Bulldogs.

Early life and high school career
Grimes began his high school career at Desert Pines High School in Las Vegas, Nevada. For his senior season, Grimes transferred to Quality Education Academy in Winston-Salem, North Carolina, with whom in 24 games he averaged 13.6 points, 9.3 rebounds, 1.7 steals, and 1.4 assists per game. In September 2014, he committed to play college basketball at Fresno State over offers from Boise State, Iowa, San Francisco, Utah State, Washington State and Wichita State.

College career
Grimes redshirted his freshman season. He averaged 1.7 points and 1.8 rebounds per game as a redshirt freshman. As a sophomore, Grimes averaged 4.6 points, 5.4 rebounds, and 1.1 blocks (7th in the conference) per game. He was third in the country in total rebounds per minute (0.44 rebounds per minute played). 

He averaged 11.8 points, 9.2 rebounds per game (3rd in the conference), and 1.7 blocks per game (2nd), while leading the conference with a two-point .625 field goal percentage, as a junior. On January 25, 2020, Grimes was suspended for one game for conduct detrimental to the team. 

As a senior, he averaged 11.5 points and 10.2 rebounds per game (3rd in the conference), while leading the conference with 1.6 blocks per game. Grimes was named to the Third Team All-Mountain West by the media. On March 16, 2020, Grimes was arrested and charged on suspicion of inflicting corporal injury to a spouse/cohabitant.

Professional career
On September 24, 2020, Grimes signed his first professional contract with Kobrat of the Korisliiga. He averaged 16.7 points, 12.6 rebounds and 1.7 assists per game.

On June 30, 2021, Grimes signed with Kangoeroes Basket Mechelen of the BNXT League. He averaged 18.0 points, 11.9 rebounds, 1.4 steals, and 1.0 block per game in eight games.

On February 19, 2022, Grimes signed with BG Göttingen of the Basketball Bundesliga. In 16 games he averaged 6.1 points, 5.2 rebounds, 0.5 blocks, and 16.5 minutes per game.

On August 4, 2022, he signed with Hapoel Eilat of the Israeli Basketball Premier League. Grimes joined Sigal Prishtina of the Kosovo Basketball League on February 6, 2023.

References

External links
Fresno State Bulldogs bio

1996 births
Living people
American men's basketball players
American expatriate basketball people in Belgium
American expatriate basketball people in Finland
American expatriate basketball people in Germany
American expatriate basketball people in Israel
Basketball players from Nevada
BG Göttingen players
Fresno State Bulldogs men's basketball players
Hapoel Eilat basketball players
Kangoeroes Basket Mechelen players
Kobrat players
Power forwards (basketball)
Sportspeople from Las Vegas